Dr Averil Olive Mansfield CBE ChM FRCS FRCP (born 21 June 1937) is a retired English vascular surgeon. She was a consultant surgeon at St Mary's Hospital in Paddington, central London, from 1982 to 2002, and in 1993 she became the first British woman to be appointed a professor of surgery.

Early life
Averil Mansfield was born in 1937 in Blackpool. Her mother suffered deep vein thrombosis and a pulmonary embolism during her difficult birth, which later influenced Mansfield's specialism in her medical career. She wanted to become a surgeon from the age of eight, after being inspired by a children's book about advances in surgery. She was educated at Blackpool Collegiate School for Girls and went on to attend the University of Liverpool School of Medicine, gaining a Bachelor of Medicine in 1960.

Career
Mansfield began her career at the Royal Liverpool University Hospital, and became a consultant vascular surgeon there in 1972 and later a lecturer in surgery at the University of Liverpool. She then moved to London in 1980 to work at Hillingdon Hospital. Two years later, she was appointed by St Mary's Hospital in Paddington as a consultant vascular surgeon. She was an honorary senior lecturer at St Mary's Hospital Medical School, which merged with the Imperial College School of Medicine in 1988. She remained at St Mary's for the rest of her career, while also serving as an honorary consultant in paediatric and vascular surgery at Great Ormond Street Hospital.

In 1991, Mansfield was the founding chairwoman of the RCS's Women in Surgical Training committee. In 1993, she was made a professor of vascular surgery at St Mary's Hospital, making her the first female professor of surgery in the United Kingdom. She was appointed a CBE in 1999 for services to surgery and women in medicine.

Mansfield retired from surgery in 2002. She was made a Fellow of the Royal College of Physicians in 2005, and was elected president of the British Medical Association in 2009–2010. In 2012 she was voted one of "100 Women Who Have Changed the World" by The Independent on Sunday.

She founded Women in Surgery, a Royal College of Surgeons initiative to encourage more women to enter the field. In May 2018, she was given a NHS Heroes Award.

Personal life
Mansfield married John William Paulton Bradley, known as Jack, a fellow surgeon, in 1987. He died in 2013. On 18 October 2020 she was the castaway on Radio 4's Desert Island Discs, interviewed by Lauren Laverne BBC Radio 4.

References

1937 births
Living people
British vascular surgeons
Women surgeons
Academics of Imperial College London
Academics of the University of Liverpool
Alumni of the University of Liverpool
Fellows of the Royal College of Physicians
Commanders of the Order of the British Empire
People educated at Blackpool Collegiate School for Girls
People from Blackpool
Physicians of St Mary's Hospital, London